Anthony Saliu Sanusi (2 January 1911 – 8 December 2009) was a Nigerian Bishop of the Roman Catholic Church.

Anthony Sanusi born in Iperu, Nigeria in 1911.

Ordained a priest on 17 December 1944 in Lagos, Nigeria. He was Appointed bishop of new created diocese of Ijebu-Ode on 29 May 1969 and received his episcopal consecration on 1 August 1969. He remained bishop of  Ijebu-Ode diocese until his retirement in 1990.

See also
Ijebu-Ode

External links
Anthony Sansui

20th-century Roman Catholic bishops in Nigeria
1911 births
2009 deaths
Yoruba Christian clergy
Roman Catholic bishops of Ijebu-Ode